Kiltormer GAA is a Gaelic Athletic Association club based in the Clontuskert, Lawrencetown and Kiltormer areas outside Ballinasloe, County Galway, Ireland. The club is primarily concerned with the game of hurling.

Overview

History

Gaelic games in the Kiltormer area have been recorded as far back as 1897.  Down through the years Clontuskert, Lawrencetown and Kiltormer affiliated separate teams, while Ganaveen and Tristaun also formed separate clubs.

In 1969 a decision was finally made to bring the three areas together and form a club under one name.  Kiltormer was chosen as the club name and the club colours were to be blue and white.  Almost immediately, success followed with the winning of minor, under-21, and intermediate championships.

Honours

All-Ireland Senior Club Hurling Championships: 1
 1992
Connacht Senior Club Hurling Championships: 3
 1982, 1990, 1991
Galway Senior Club Hurling Championships: 5
 1976, 1977, 1982, 1990, 1991

Notable players

 Justin Campbell
 Andy Fenton
 Conor Hayes
 Ollie Kilkenny
 Tony Kilkenny

External links
A History of Kiltormer GAA club

Gaelic games clubs in County Galway
Hurling clubs in County Galway